Ciliandra Fangiono is an Indonesian businessman and the chief executive officer of First Resources, a palm oil company registered in Singapore with plantation assets located entirely in Indonesia. His family owns a majority stake in the company, which was founded by his father, Martias, in 1992. He and his family, including his brother, own 85 percent of the company. His estimated net worth is $1.05 billion as of 2020.

Career 
He has a Bachelor and Master of Arts Economics degree from Cambridge University, UK. During his studies at Cambridge, he was a Senior Scholar in Economics and won the PriceWaterhouse Book Prize.

Ciliandra first started working at Merrill Lynch in Singapore.

Personal life 
His brother Cik Sigih Fangiono is the  deputy chief executive of First Resources. Fangiono is married to Serene Lim Mei Jin and has four children.

References 

Alumni of the University of Cambridge
Indonesian business executives
1976 births
Living people